The 2015 World Junior Wrestling Championships were the 39th edition of the World Junior Wrestling Championships and were held in Salvador da Bahia, Brazil between August 11–16, 2015 .

Medal table

Team ranking

Medal summary

Men's freestyle

Men's Greco-Roman

Women's freestyle

References

World Junior Championships
Wrestling Championships
International wrestling competitions hosted by Brazil
Sport in Brazil
Wrestling in Brazil
World Junior Wrestling Championships